Hertswood Academy (formerly Hertswood School) is a coeducational secondary school in Borehamwood, Hertfordshire which gained academy status in January 2013. The headteacher is Peter Gillett, who joined Hertswood Academy in January 2013.

It was established in September 2000 by an amalgamation of five former local schools, which was reflected by the two different sites of the academy previously . The academy has since moved to a single site as part of a project to build new "World Class Facilities". school that started work in 2015, which was funded by selling one of the sites for housing. After two years of construction, the new academy buildings opened in September 2019.

An Ofsted inspection in 2017 stated Hertswood Academy was "inadequate" due to issues with "personal development, behaviour and welfare". A monitoring visit in May 2018 stated that "leaders and managers are taking effective actions". Ofsted conducted a further inspection in September 2019, with the report yet to be published.

History
The two sites of the academy were previously two of five schools which were closed to be combined into the then named Hertswood School.

Beginnings
Hertswood School was established to replace Borehamwood's old three-tier system of lower, middle and upper schools with a two-tier system. As such, Lyndhurst, Furzehill and Holmshill middle schools were closed, along with Hawksmoor and Hillside upper schools. The new, larger school was established on the sites of Nicholas Hawksmoor School (previously Borehamwood Grammar School) and Holmshill Secondary Modern, the two schools having been approximately 400 metres apart. The reorganisation was paid for through the sale of the three other sites for housing development.

The school opened in September 2000 under Headteacher Ian Lucas.

Arts college and theatre
Hertswood School gained specialist arts college status in 2005 and in 2009 The Ark Theatre Borehamwood was established on its upper site. The majority of the two million pound facility was funded by Hertsmere Borough Council, which remains a funding partner to the theatre, as does the academy itself. In addition to the theatre, facilities include a bar and meeting room.

Academy status
In September 2012, Hertswood became an academy under the Academies Act (2010).

Single site development

In November 2013, the academy announced plans to move the entire school to new buildings on the Cowley Hill site, funded by the sale of the Thrift Farm Lane site which would be demolished for housing. In March 2014 plans were pushed back to extend the consultation period.

A planning application was submitted in December 2014 for the new academy, temporary classrooms and the residential development on the Thrift Farm Lane site. This was part of a schedule to move all students to the Cowley Hill site in December 2015 and open the new academy in September 2019.

The academy stated that the new build would include "a first class community theatre and community sports facilities" as well as "cutting-edge ICT in every classroom, expansive open learning spaces and a superb new restaurant." The new building opened to students as planned in September 2019 for the start of the 2019–20 academic year.

Academy structure

Students and staff
The academy has approximately 1,300 students, including boys and girls from the age of 11 to 18. This includes approximately 200 students in the academy's sixth form. There are approximately 100 teaching staff, with approximately 40 support staff.

House system
In 2013 the academy introduced a new house system with four houses, each named after a college at Oxford or Cambridge: Cavendish (blue), Darwin (green), Nuffield (yellow) and Somerville (red). The assigned colour of the house that a student belongs to is displayed on a badge on the student's blazer.

Each house has a staff member assigned as its head, a House Captain from the Upper Sixth Form, and a Vice House Captain selected from the Lower Sixth Form. The academy arranges inter-house competitions through the school year and tracks the total House Points each house has earned, towards winning the House Cup at the end of each year.

Alumni
Famous alumni include:

 Sophie Pender, founder of the 93% Club
 Phineas "A1" Waweru, rapper and part of duo "A1 x J1"
 Jyrelle (Loski) O'Connor-Greenland, drill artist and member of Harlem Spartans

References

Schools in Hertsmere
Secondary schools in Hertfordshire
Academies in Hertfordshire
Educational institutions established in 2000
Borehamwood
2000 establishments in England
Shenley